Amerind is a hypothetical higher-level language family proposed by Joseph Greenberg in 1960 and elaborated by his student Merritt Ruhlen. Greenberg proposed that all of the indigenous languages of the Americas belong to one of three language families, the previously established Eskimo–Aleut and Na–Dene, and with everything else—otherwise classified by specialists as belonging to dozens of independent families—as Amerind. Due to a large number of methodological flaws in the 1987 book Language in the Americas, the relationships he proposed between these languages were long rejected by the majority of historical linguists as spurious, but have recently been revived by genetic findings.

The term Amerind is also occasionally used to refer broadly to the various indigenous languages of the Americas without necessarily implying that they are a genealogical group. To avoid ambiguity, the term Amerindian is often used for the latter meaning.

Background
The idea that all the languages of the Americas are related goes back to the 19th century when early linguists such as Peter Stephen DuPonceau and Wilhelm von Humboldt noticed that the languages of the Americas seemed to be very different from the better known European languages, yet seemingly also quite similar to each other. When studies of American Indian languages began in earnest in the early 20th century linguists quickly realized that the indigenous languages were in fact not all that similar, but had a diversity much greater than among the languages of Europe. After a period of uncertainty about whether indigenous languages could be described and investigated by the methods applied to European languages, the first linguists began the daunting task of trying to classify the languages of the Americas by using the comparative method.

Among the most prolific and gifted linguists of his times was Edward Sapir, who was among the first to apply the comparative method to Native American languages. However, contrary to current practice in historical linguistics, Sapir also often relied on "hunches" and "gut feeling" when proposing new language families. Some of these suggestions have been proven correct while others have not. Sapir entertained the idea that ultimately all languages of the Americas might turn out to be provably related and such a phenomenon as the apparent Pan-American tendency to have first person forms with a prefixed n- was suggestive for this line of thought.

Since Sapir's death in 1939, linguists have spent their time researching his proposals; typically, there have been two opposing camps in this endeavor: the so-called "lumpers" who usually look towards notions of genetic relationships, and the "splitters" who are widely critical of such proposals and expect successful family relations to be proven by the most rigorous standards of scholarship. Joseph Greenberg worked in the tradition of "lumpers" and following Sapir, was mindful of evidence not generally acceptable to those who hold that only actual linguistic reconstruction—through the comparative method—can yield reliable proof of genetic relationships between languages. In elaborating his classification of the Amerind languages, Greenberg relied heavily on Sapir's early work on the North American languages and the highly impressionist classification of South American languages by Paul Rivet.

Pronouns

The main argument for the validity of Amerind is a pronominal pattern in many Native American languages that have first person forms with n and second person forms with m. 
This pattern was first noted by Alfredo Trombetti in 1905. Sapir suggested that it indicated that ultimately all Native American languages would turn out to be related. However, it is not universal, being confined primarily to western North America and to a lesser extent Mesoamerica; the incidence elsewhere is not statistically significant, and in western North American it is more an argument for the Hokan and Penutian phyla than for Amerind.

Gender 
Ruhlen reconstructed a morphological (ablaut) gender system for proto-Amerind, with masculine kinship terms containing the vowel *i and feminine the vowel *u, that he claims proves Greenberg's reconstruction. This is based on Greenberg's *t'a'na 'child', to which Ruhlen adds a masculine derivation *t'i'na 'son, boy' and a feminine *t'u'na 'daughter, girl'.

Unlike the n-/m- pattern in the pronouns, an intact i/u gender system is not attested across language families, and the consensus is that the pattern is a spurious one.

Reception 
The consensus among historical linguists specializing in Native American languages is that the Amerind hypothesis is unsupported by valid evidence, particularly because the basis for the proposal is mass comparison, but also because of many other methodological flaws made by Greenberg in the elaboration of the hypothesis. Critics regard this technique as fundamentally flawed, unable to distinguish chance resemblances from those due to a historical relationship among the languages and providing no means of distinguishing resemblances due to common descent from those due to language contact.  In addition, critics have pointed out errors in the citation of data, including erroneous forms, erroneous glosses, unjustified morphological segmentation, attribution to the wrong language, and citation of entirely spurious forms.

A further criticism is that, contrary to normal scholarly practice, no source references are given for the data, which in most cases come from languages for which there is no standard, authoritative source. In addition, Greenberg does not normalize the spelling of the data, so it is impossible without knowing the source of each form to know what the notation represents.

While sympathetic to the idea of an Amerind language family, Morris Swadesh was critical of many of Greenberg's subdivisions and believed it was due to an insufficient number of comparisons by Greenberg.

Classification
The 1960 proposal, in its outlines, was as follows:

Almosan–Keresiouan
Hokan
Penutian (incl. Macro-Mayan)
Aztec–Tanoan
Oto-Mangean
Purépecha
Macro-Chibchan
Chibchan
Paezan
Andean–Equatorial
Andean
Jivaroan
Macro-Tucanoan
Equatorial (with Macro-Arawakan and Tupian)
Ge–Pano–Carib
Macro-Ge
Macro-Panoan
Macro-Carib
Nambikwara
Huarpe
Taruma

Below is the current state of Amerindian classification, as given in An Amerind Etymological Dictionary, by Joseph Greenberg and Merritt Ruhlen, Stanford University, 2007.

 North–Central Amerind
 Northern Amerind
 Almosan–Keresiouan
 Almosan
 Algic
 Kutenai
 Mosan
 Chimakuan
 Salishan
 Wakashan
 Keresiouan
 Caddoan
 Iroquoian
 Keresan
 Siouan–Yuchi
 Siouan
 Yuchi
 Penutian–Hokan
 Penutian
 Tsimshian
 Chinook
 Oregon
 Plateau
 California
 Maiduan
 Miwok–Costanoan
 Wintun
 Yokutsan
 Zuni
 Gulf
 Atakapa
 Chitimacha
 Muskogean
 Natchez
 Tunica
 Yukian
 Yuki
 Wappo
 Mexican Penutian
 Huave
 Mayan
 Mixe–Zoque
 Totonac
 Hokan
 Northern Hokan
 Karok–Shasta
 Karok
 Chimariko
 Shasta–Achomawi
 Shasta
 Achomawi
 Yana
 Pomoan
 Washo
 Salinan–Chumash
 Salinan
 Chumash
 Esselen
 Seri–Yuman
 Seri
 Yuman
 Waicuri–Quinigua
 Waicuri
 Maratino
 Quinigua
 Coahuiltecan
 Tequistlatec
 Subtiaba
 Jicaque
 Yurumangui
 Central Amerind
 Tanoan
 Uto-Aztekan
 Oto-Manguean
 Southern Amerind
 Andean–Chibchan–Paezan
 Chibchan–Paezan
 Macro-Chibchan
 Cuitlatec
 Lenca
 Chibchan
 Paya
 Purépecha
 Yanomam
 Yunca–Puruhan
 Macro-Paezan
 Allentiac
 Atacama
 Betoi
 Chimu–Mochita
 Itonama
 Jirajara
 Mura
 Paezan
 Timucua
 Warrao
 Andean
 Aymara
 Itucale–Sabela
 Itucale
 Mayna
 Sabela
 Cahuapana–Zaparo
 Cahuapana
 Zaparo
 Northern Andean
 Catacao
 Cholona
 Culli
 Leco
 Sechura
 Quechua
 Southern Andean
 Qawasqar
 Mapudungu
 Gennaken
 Chon
 Yamana
 Equatorial–Tucanoan
 Equatorial
 Macro-Arawakan
 Cayuvava
 Coche
 Jivaro–Kandoshi
 Cofán
 Esmeralda
 Jivaro
 Kandoshi
 Yaruro
 Kariri–Tupi
 Piaroa
 Taruma
 Timote
 Trumai
 Tusha
 Yuracaré
 Zamuco
 Macro-Tucanoan
 Auixiri
 Canichana
 Capixana
 Catuquina
 Gamella
 Huari
 Iranshe
 Kaliana–Maku
 Koaia
 Movima
 Muniche
 Nambikwara
 Natu
 Pankaruru
 Puinave
 Shukuru
 Ticuna–Yuri
 Tucanoan
 Uman
 Ge–Pano–Carib
 Macro-Carib
 Andoke
 Bora–Uitoto
 Carib
 Kukura [spurious]
 Yagua
 Macro-Panoan
  Charruan
  Lengua
  Lule–Vilela
  Mataco–Guaicuru
  Moseten
  Pano–Tacanan
 Macro-Gê
 Bororo
 Botocudo
 Caraja
 Chiquito
 Erikbatsa
 Fulnio
 Ge–Kaingang
 Guató
 Kamakan
 Mashakali
 Opaie
 Oti
 Puri
 Yabuti

See also 

Principal advocates of the Amerind hypothesis or its predecessors
Alfredo Trombetti
Joseph H. Greenberg
Merritt Ruhlen
Non-Amerind American language families
Na-Dené
Eskimo–Aleut

Notes

References 

 Adelaar, Willem F. H. (1989). [Review of Greenberg, Language in the Americas]. Lingua, 78, 249-255.
 Berman, Howard. (1992). A comment on the Yurok and Kalapuya data in Greenberg's Language in the Americas. International Journal of American Linguistics, 58 (2), 230-233.
 Bonnichsen, Robson; & Steele, D. Gentry (Eds.). (1994). Method and theory for investigating the peopling of the Americas. Peopling of the Americas publications. Corvallis, OR: Oregon State University, Center for the Study of the First Americans. .
 Campbell, Lyle. (1988). [Review of Language in the Americas, Greenberg 1987]. Language, 64, 591-615.
 Campbell, Lyle. (1997). American Indian languages: The historical linguistics of Native America. New York: Oxford University Press. .
Campbell, Lyle; Poser, William J. (2008) Language Classification, History and Method, Cambridge University Press
 Chafe, Wallace. (1987). [Review of Greenberg 1987]. Current Anthropology, 28, 652-653.
 
 Goddard, Ives. (1987).  [Review of Joseph Greenberg, Language in the Americas]. Current Anthropology, 28, 656-657.
 Goddard, Ives. (1990).  [Review of Language in the Americas by Joseph H. Greenberg]. Linguistics, 28, 556-558.
 Goddard, Ives. (1996).  The classification of native languages of North America. In I. Goddard (Ed.), Languages (pp. 290–323). Handbook of North Americans Indians (Vol. 17). Washington, D. C.: Smithsonian Institution.
 Goddard, Ives (Ed.). (1996). Languages. Handbook of North American Indians (W. C. Sturtevant, General Ed.) (Vol. 17). Washington, D. C.: Smithsonian Institution. .
 Goddard, Ives; & Campbell, Lyle. (1994). The history and classification of American Indian languages: What are the implications for the peopling of the Americas?. In R. Bonnichsen & D. Steele (Eds.), Method and theory for investigating the peopling of the Americas (pp. 189–207). Corvallis, OR: Oregon State University.
 Golla, Victor. (1987).  [Review of Joseph H. Greenberg: Language in the Americas]. Current Anthropology, 28, 657-659.
 Golla, Victor. (1988).  [Review of Language in the Americas, by Joseph Greenberg]. American Anthropologist, 90, 434-435.
 Greenberg, Joseph H. (1960). General classification of Central and South American languages. In A. Wallace (Ed.), Men and cultures: Fifth international congress of anthropological and ethnological sciences (1956) (pp. 791–794). Philadelphia: University of Pennsylvania Press.
 Greenberg, Joseph H. (1987). Language in the Americas. Stanford: Stanford University Press.
 Greenberg, Joseph H. (1987). Language in the Americas: Author's précis. Current Anthropology, 28, 647-652.
 Greenberg, Joseph H. (1989). Classification of American Indian languages: A reply to Campbell. Language, 65, 107-114.
 Greenberg, Joseph H. (1996). In defense of Amerind. International Journal of American Linguistics, 62, 131-164.

 Kimball, Geoffrey. (1992). A critique of Muskogean, 'Gulf,' and Yukian materials in Language in the Americas. International Journal of American Linguistics, 58, 447-501.
 Matisoff, James. (1990). On megalo-comparison: A discussion note. Language, 66, 106-120.
 Mithun, Marianne. (1999). The languages of Native North America. Cambridge: Cambridge University Press.  (hbk); .
 
 Poser, William J. (1992). The Salinan and Yurumanguí data in Language in the Americas. International Journal of American Linguistics, 58 (2), 202-229. PDF
 Rankin, Robert. (1992). [Review of Language in the Americas by J. H. Greenberg]. International Journal of American Linguistics, 58 (3), 324-351.
 Reich, David (2018). Who we are and how we got here. Oxford: OUP. 2018.
 Ringe, Don (2000).  Some relevant facts about historical linguistics.  In: Renfrew, Colin (Ed.), America Past, America Present: Genes and Languages in the Americas and Beyond (pp. 139–62). Cambridge, UK: McDonald Institute for Archaeological Research.

External links 
 Google.books: Greenberg, Joseph. 'Language in the Americas'. 1987. 
 The home page of Merritt Ruhlen, one of the advocates of the Amerind hypothesis.

 
 
Proposed language families